Neil Crompton is the British ambassador to Saudi Arabia since in February 2020.

Career
Crompton previously served in Washington DC and Tehran as well as in London as the Foreign and Commonwealth Office's Director for the Middle East and North Africa Directorate. He speaks Persian and Arabic.

Crompton was educated at Durham University.

References

Living people
Ambassadors of the United Kingdom to Saudi Arabia
Members of HM Diplomatic Service
Alumni of University College, Durham
Year of birth missing (living people)
21st-century British diplomats